Eleanor Cory (born 1943) is an American composer.

Cory studied at Sarah Lawrence College, Harvard University, New England Conservatory, and Columbia University. She has taught at Yale University, Baruch College, Manhattan School of Music, Sarah Lawrence College, Brooklyn College, and The New School for Social Research and currently teaches at Mannes College of Music Prep Division and Kingsborough Community College, CUNY.

External links
Eleanor Cory Website

1943 births
Living people
American women classical composers
American classical composers
Sarah Lawrence College alumni
Harvard University alumni
New England Conservatory alumni
Columbia University alumni
Yale University faculty
Baruch College faculty
Manhattan School of Music faculty
Sarah Lawrence College faculty
Brooklyn College faculty
The New School faculty
Women music educators
American women academics
21st-century American women